Kamal Humphrey de Iruretagoyena, better known by his stage name Radioinactive, is an American hip hop artist from Los Angeles, California. He is a member of The Shape Shifters. He was a member of Log Cabin along with Eligh, Murs and Scarub. He has released a number of solo albums, as well as collaborating with artists such as Busdriver, Daedelus, and Antimc.

Life and career
Radioinactive released the first solo album, Pyramidi, on Mush Records in 2001. The Weather, his collaborative album with rapper Busdriver and producer Daedelus, was released on the label in 2003.

In 2004, he released a collaborative album with producer Antimc, titled Free Kamal, on Mush Records. Josh Drimmer of Dusted Magazine said: "Intelligent and fun, it’s a good record to listen to with a cool glass of lemonade. And a dictionary."

His second solo album, Soundtrack to a Book, was released on Stranger Touch Records in 2006. Mason Jones of Dusted Magazine described it as "an excellent mini-album, perhaps the best yet from Radioinactive." He released the third solo album, The Akashic Record, on Flying Carpet Studios in 2012.

Discography

Albums
 Pyramidi (2001)
 The Weather (2003) 
 Free Kamal (2004) 
 Soundtrack to a Book (2006)
 The Akashic Record (2012)

EPs
 The Music (1999)
 Fo' Tractor (2003)
 Hip-Hop Helmet (2014)

Singles
 "Touch Type" b/w "Winthorp & Winthorp" (2003) 
 "Mint Tea" b/w "Bury Me Standing" (2012) 
 "Chump" (2013)
 "Natural Born Loser" (2016)

Guest appearances
 Omid - "Farmers Market of the Beast" from Beneath the Surface (1998)
 Neila - "Da Duh" from Starting Early (2000)
 Busdriver - "Somethingness" from Temporary Forever (2002)
 TTC - "Latest Dance Craze" from Batards Sensibles (2004)
 Awol One - "Gagbuster" from Self Titled (2004)
 Akuma and Factor - "Dig Dig Dig" from Dawn of a New Era (2005)
 Poirier - "Propaganda" from Rebondir EP (2006)
 Phoenix Orion & Paranorml - "Ahead of Our Time" from Beyonders: Time Capsule (2006)
 Prosperous - "Limo Clorox" from Solar Residue (2006)
 M.Fusion - "One Life to Live" from The Goth Kid EP (2007)
 Existereo - "Shifter Track" from Excuse My French (2010)
 Blaq Tongue Society - "Third Eye of the Sun" from Blaq Tongue Society (2013)

References

External links
 Radioinactive on Mush Records
 
 

American hip hop record producers
American male rappers
Rappers from Los Angeles
Living people
Year of birth missing (living people)
21st-century American rappers
Record producers from California
21st-century American male musicians